In algebraic number theory, through completion, the study of ramification of a prime ideal can often be reduced to the case of local fields where a more detailed analysis can be carried out with the aid of tools such as ramification groups.

In this article, a local field is non-archimedean and has finite residue field.

Unramified extension 
Let  be a finite Galois extension of nonarchimedean local fields with finite residue fields  and Galois group . Then the following are equivalent.
(i)  is unramified.
(iii) 

The above implies that there is an equivalence of categories between the finite unramified extensions of a local field K and finite separable extensions of the residue field of K.

Totally ramified extension 

Again, let  be a finite Galois extension of nonarchimedean local fields with finite residue fields  and Galois group . The following are equivalent.
  is totally ramified
  coincides with its inertia subgroup.
  where  is a root of an Eisenstein polynomial.

See also 
Abhyankar's lemma
Unramified morphism

References

 
 

Algebraic number theory